I Always Loved You is a 1953 Italian melodrama film directed by Mario Costa. It is based on a stage play by Enrico Ragusa.

Plot 
A landowner loves a good girl, but is ensnared by another richer woman who is actually aiming for her fortune. This she will be able to temporarily make the two young men go away but the man makes his girlfriend understand that her is true love; he realizes that he has been the victim of a scam and will bring the woman he has always loved to the altar.

Cast 

Amedeo Nazzari as Massimo Alberti
Myriam Bru as  Maria
Jacques Sernas as  Carlo Manfredini
Adriano Rimoldi as  Giorgio
Tamara Lees as  Clara
Marisa Merlini as  Lucia
Aldo Silvani as  Luigi 
 Celeste Almieri Calza as  Miss Margherita Manfredini
Margherita Bagni as  Sister Margherita 
Cesare Bettarini as Don Antonio
Aldo Bufi Landi as  Mario
Miranda Campa as Anna
Vera Carmi as Sister  Anna
 Annette Ciarli  as Aunt Adelaide
Rina Franchetti as  Assunta
Aldo Giuffrè as  Felice

References

External links

I Always Loved You at Variety Distribution

1953 films
Italian drama films
Films directed by Mario Costa
1953 drama films
Italian black-and-white films
Melodrama films
1950s Italian films
1950s Italian-language films